DMT Azul (born December 20, 1982) is the best known ring name of a Mexican Luchador Enmascarado, or masked professional wrestler. He is currently signed to Lucha Libre AAA Worldwide. Azul is best known for his time in Mexican professional wrestling promotion Consejo Mundial de Lucha Libre (CMLL). He originally wrestled under the ring name El Romano but in 2009 he was given a new name and mask, Metro, a ring name that had been used by at least three other CMLL wrestlers before 2009. The "Metro" ring character was sponsored by the Mexico City Metro newspaper, incorporating the newspapers logo and color scheme (red and gold) in the mask and wrestling trunks. In early 2012 he  was given a new image and ring name, dropping the sponsored ring name to become Diamante Azul instead. Diamante Azul is Spanish for "Blue Diamond".

Diamante Azul's real name is not a matter of public record, as is often the case with masked wrestlers in Mexico where their private lives are kept a secret from the wrestling fans. He is a former NWA World Historic Light Heavyweight Champion, CMLL World Tag Team Champion with Atlantis and winner of the 2012 Leyenda de Azul tournament.

Professional wrestling career
While the wrestler who would later become known as Diamante Azul has never revealed his birth name, he did unveil that he was born on December 20, 1982. Lucha libre has a long-held tradition of not revealing the birth name of masked wrestlers unless they are later unmasked. Due to the secretive nature of lucha libre it is possible that he made his wrestling debut prior to 2007 under a masked or unmasked identity that has not been revealed yet.

The future Diamante Azul was trained for his professional wrestling career by Tony Salazar and Franco Columbo at Consejo Mundial de Lucha Libre's (CMLL) wrestling school in Mexico City, Mexico. He made his official professional wrestling debut in 2007 under the ring name "El Romano" (Spanish for "The Roman"). He wore a mask fashioned after a Galea or Roman Soldier helmet and the original plan was for him to team up with Méssala and Calígula, two long time CMLL wrestlers who used similar Roman soldier ring characters. He only worked intermittently as El Romano in 2007 and 2008, disappearing for long stretches of time to receive further training from Salazar and Columbo.

Consejo Mundial de Lucha Libre (2009–2021)

Metro (2009–2012)
On January 7, 2009, he made his debut under a new mask and ring name "Metro". The Metro character was sponsored by the major Mexico City newspaper of the same name, incorporating the newspapers logo and color scheme (Red and gold) in both the mask and the trunks worn. The "Metro" ring character was introduced in 2006 and had previously been given to young wrestlers who had yet to establish their own ring character. Throughout 2009 Metro worked in low card matches on CMLL shows, slowly advancing up the ranks to sometimes working in the semi-main event on a few shows. On December 19, 2009, it was announced by the Comisión de Box y Lucha Libre Mexico Distrito Federal ("The Mexico City Boxing and Wrestling commission") that the trio known as Poder Mexica ("Mexican Power") had been stripped of the Mexican National Trios Championship because Black Power) left CMLL, thus breaking up the team. The Commission also announced an eight team tournament to crown new trios champions. The first part of the tournament took place on December 22, 2009, and the second part of the tournament occurred on December 29. Metro was teamed up with Mascara Dorada and Stuka, Jr. for the first time ever and defeated Los Guerreros Tuareg (Arkangel de la Muerte, Loco Max and Skándalo) in the first round and Los Cancerberos del Infierno (Virus, Euforia and Polvora) in the second round to qualify for the finals. The bottom bracket took place on December 29, 2009, and saw the team of Poder Mexica (Sangre Azteca, Dragón Rojo, Jr. and Misterioso, Jr.) qualify for the final. On January 6, 2010, Mascara Dorada, Stuka, Jr. and Metro defeated Poder Mexica to become the new Mexican National Trios Champions, Metro's first professional wrestling championship.

Since he was one third of the Mexican National Trios Championship team, Metro participated in the 2010 Universal Championship tournament, a 16-man tournament featuring CMLL recognized champions. Metro was part of "Block B" that competed on the August 6, 2010 Super Viernes show. He was the first wrestler eliminated in the seeding battle royal and then lost to Héctor Garza, then-reigning CMLL World Heavyweight Champion, in the first round. On November 18, 2010, Máscara Dorada announced that he was relinquishing his part of the Mexican National Trios Championship due to holding three other championships at the same time. Metro and Stuka, Jr.'s new partner would be determined in an online poll. On December 20, 2010, CMLL announced that Delta had won the poll and was now one third of the championship team, alongside Metro and Stuka, Jr. On January 9, 2011, Metro, Delta and Stuka, Jr. lost the Mexican National Trios Championship to Ángel de Oro, Diamante and Rush, who were the three other options in the online poll. On November 16, Metro formed a new group with Shocker and CMLL newcomers Titán and Tritón.

Diamante Azul (2012–2021)
On February 16, 2012, Metro was repackaged under the ring name "Diamante Azul" (Blue Diamond). He was given a blue mask, trunks and a cape, which all closely resembled the mask and ring gear of lucha libre legend Blue Demon and his successor Blue Demon, Jr. On the August 3 Super Viernes show, Diamante Azul and Atlantis defeated Dragón Rojo, Jr. and Último Guerrero to win the CMLL World Tag Team Championship. On the October 12 Super Viernes show, Diamante Azul won the 2012 Leyenda de Azul tournament, a tournament named after Blue Demon. On November 11, 2012, New Japan Pro-Wrestling (NJPW) announced that Diamante Azul and Rush would team up under the name CMLL Asesino (CMLL Assassins) for the 2012 World Tag League, that would take place from November 20 through December 2. On November 13, 2012, Atlantis and Demonio Azul lost their tag team championship to El Terrible and Tama Tonga. Diamante Azul and Rush entered the World Tag League on November 21, defeating former four-time IWGP Tag Team Champions Tencozy (Hiroyoshi Tenzan and Satoshi Kojima) in their opening match.

Diamante and Rush ended the tournament on November 28, 2012, with just four points after victories over Tencozy and Masato Tanaka and Yujiro Takahashi, finishing in the last place in Group B, after losses to the teams of Toru Yano and Takashi Iizuka, K.E.S. (Lance Archer and Davey Boy Smith, Jr.), Manabu Nakanishi and Strongman and finally Shelton Benjamin and MVP. Diamante Azul and Rush finished their tour with a pay-per-view show on December 2, losing to Jado and Yoshi-Hashi in a tag team match, with Diamante Azul once again being the one pinned for the win. Diamante Azul teamed up with Rudo Euforia for the 2013 Torneo Nacional de Parejas Increibles ("National Incredible Pairs Tournament") where the concept was that rivals would team up for a tag team tournament. The team would defeat Ángel de Oro and Ephesto in the first round of the tournament, but lost to Atlantis and Último Guerrero in the second round. On June 4, Diamante Azul defeated Rey Bucanero to win the NWA World Historic Light Heavyweight Championship, his first singles championship.

In November 2014, Diamante Azul moved to France with his family. After not returning to CMLL for three months, the promotion stripped him of the NWA World Historic Light Heavyweight Championship in February 2015. In June 2015 Diamante Azul returned to CMLL, earning the right to face Rey Bucanero for the NWA World Historic Light Heavyweight Championship that he had previously been stripped off, but lost the match. He worked for CMLL in June and July 2015, then was not seen in a CMLL ring until November 2015.

Diamante Azul returned to Mexico May 2016, resuming his work with CMLL as well as the CMLL-affiliated Elite Pro promotion. In his first match back in Mexico he competed for the Elite Heavyweight Championship in an eight-man battle royal. Diamante Azul was the fourth man eliminated by eventual match and championship winner Cibernético. On June 5, Diamante Azul teamed up with Atlantis once more, with the team losing to reigning CMLL World Tag Team Champions Negro Casas and Shocker. On June 9, 2016, Diamante Azul worked as a rudo (a heel, someone who portrays the bad guy in wrestling) for the first time as he teamed up with Mr. Niebla and Rey Escorpión, losing to the team of Golden Magic, Ángel de Oro and Carístico. The following show he was back to working on the tecnico side (the "face" side, those that portray the good guys). In the fall of 2016 Diamante Azule was one of sixteen participants in the 2016 Leyenda de Azul ("The Blue Legend") torneo cibernetico elimination match. Unlike the 2012 Leyenda de Azul, Diamante Azul was eliminated about half-way through the match.

On March 17, 2017, at Homenaje a Dos Leyendas, Diamante Azul defeated Pierroth in a Mask vs. Mask Lucha de Apuestas. On September 1, Diamante Azul won the 2017 International Gran Prix by last eliminating Michael Elgin. On March 13, 2018, Azul lost the Occidente Heavyweight Championship against Furia Roja. Diamante Azul would left CMLL in May 2021, since he felt his career in CMLL was going to nowhere.

Lucha Libre AAA Worldwide (2021–present)
On May 1, 2021, Diamante Azul made his debut in rival promotion debut AAA at Rey de Reyes event attacking Psycho Clown, Chessman and Pagano. That same fight he allied himself with Puma King and Sam Adonis forming a stable called La Empresa (The Enterprise).

International Wrestling Revolution Group (2021–present)
Azul would makes his debut for International Wrestling Revolution Group on May 5, 2021, now going as DMT Azul. On May 9, Azul faced El Hijo de Canis Lupus in a match for the IWRG Rey del Ring championship. Azul was disqualified when he performed a Piledriver on Hijo de Canis Lupus. Since it's a banned move in Mexico, Lupus won the title.

Metro: A shared identity
Several CMLL wrestlers have worked under the sponsored ring name "Metro", the most recent Metro was generally referred to as "Metro (III)" in writing but none of them are officially numbered nor promoted as separate wrestlers.

Metro (I) – The first Metro who used the name in 2005 and 2006. Later wrestled under the name Fabián el Gitano until his death.
Metro (Guadalajara) – Worked as Metro around the same time as Metro I, but only worked in CMLL's Farm league in Guadalajara, Jalisco. Now works under the ring name Azazel.
Metro (II) – Worked as Metro in 2006 and 2007. Currently wrestles as Neutrón.

Championships and accomplishments
Consejo Mundial de Lucha Libre
CMLL World Tag Team Championship (2 times) – with Atlantis, with Valiente
Distrito Federal Heavyweight Championship (1 time)
Mexican National Trios Championship (1 time) – with Stuka, Jr. and Máscara Dorada/Delta
Mexican National Heavyweight Championship (1 time)
NWA World Historic Light Heavyweight Championship (1 time)
Occidente Heavyweight Championship (1 time)
International Gran Prix (2017)
Leyenda de Azul (2012)
Torneo Parejas Increíbles Puebla (2019) – with Tiger
Lucha Libre AAA Worldwide
AAA World Trios Championship (1 time) – with  Puma King and Sam Adonis
Pro Wrestling Illustrated
Ranked No. 228 of the top 500 singles wrestlers in the PWI 500 in 2019

Luchas de Apuestas record

References

1983 births
Living people
Masked wrestlers
Mexican male professional wrestlers
Unidentified wrestlers
Professional wrestlers from Mexico City
AAA World Trios Champions
Mexican National Trios Champions
21st-century professional wrestlers
CMLL World Tag Team Champions
NWA World Historic Light Heavyweight Champions